The Seventeenth Canadian Ministry was the cabinet chaired by Prime Minister Louis St-Laurent.  It governed Canada from 15 November 1948 to 21 June 1957, including the end of the 20th Canadian Parliament, as well as all of the 21st and 22nd.  The government was formed by the Liberal Party of Canada.

Ministers

References

Succession

17
Ministries of George VI
Ministries of Elizabeth II
1948 establishments in Canada
1957 disestablishments in Canada
Cabinets established in 1948
Cabinets disestablished in 1957